The Marquis de Vaudreuil may refer to:
Philippe de Rigaud de Vaudreuil (1643–1702), governor of Montréal then of New France
Pierre de Rigaud de Vaudreuil (1698–1778), last governor-general of New France
Louis-Philippe de Rigaud, Marquis of Vaudreuil (1691 – 1763), French admiral
Louis-Philippe de Rigaud, Marquis de Vaudreuil (1724 – 1802), French admiral, son of the former